Jakob Segal (17 April 1911 – 30 September 1995) was a Russian-born German biology professor at Humboldt University of Berlin in the former East Germany. He was one of the advocates of the conspiracy theory that HIV was created by the United States government at Fort Detrick, Maryland.

After the fall of the Soviet Union, KGB defector Vasili Mitrokhin and two former members of East Germany's secret police revealed that Segal was a Soviet disinformation agent who worked for the KGB.

Early life and education

Segal was born in Saint Petersburg, Russian Empire, into a Lithuanian Jewish family, the son of Hermann Segal, a merchant from Kaunas (1880–1941), and Rebekka (née Schlimakowski; 1887–1941). He had an older brother, Moshe, an electrician. When he was 8, his family moved to Königsberg, Prussia (now Kaliningrad, Russia). He was educated in Berlin and Munich, where he joined the Red Students' League (Roter Studentenbund) and the Communist Party of Germany. In 1933, he immigrated to France, where he furthered his studies in Toulouse before earning a doctorate in physiology from the Sorbonne in 1936.

During the Second World War, he and his German wife, Lilli  (née Schlesinger, whom he had met at university in Toulouse) joined the resistance as part of the Main-d'œuvre immigrée and went underground. All of his family, including his parents and brother, were killed in the Holocaust. Lilli was arrested in 1943 and deported to Auschwitz in July 1944, but was sent to a work camp and survived by escaping that November. In 1946, he joined the Centre national de la recherche scientifique.

Following the Soviet annexation of Lithuania during the war, Segal and wife accepted Soviet citizenship. In the early 1950s, he moved to East Germany, reportedly on the recommendation of Soviet officials, becoming informeller Mitarbeiter. In 1952, he became a biology professor at Humboldt University in East Berlin, and in 1953 founded its Institute for Applied Bacteriology. From 1967–70, he worked at the National Center for Scientific Research in Havana, Cuba. He moved to Mexico City, where he retired in the early 1970s before returning to East Berlin.

Operation Infektion

Segal was recruited out of retirement by the KGB for Operation INFEKTION, a disinformation campaign designed to spread the belief that HIV/AIDS was created by the United States Government. According to U.S. intelligence historian Thomas Boghardt, Segal possibly suspected it was a Soviet campaign when approached by the Stasi (MfS):

Segal, together with his wife and Ronald Dehmlow, a fellow retired professor from Humboldt, published a 47-page pamphlet titled AIDS—Its Nature and Origin, in which they speculated that AIDS was the creation of the U.S. government, which had first tested it on gay prison inmates. What became known as the "Segal Report" was distributed by the Stasi and KGB at the Eighth Conference of Non-Aligned Nations, held 1–6 September 1986 in Harare, Zimbabwe, which was attended by representatives of more than 100 Third World countries. It produced the desired effect at the conference, and its claims were reprinted in the press in more than 25 countries in Africa.

One of Segal's claims was that Prof. Robert Gallo crossed the Visna sheep virus with the Human T-lymphotropic virus (HTLV I) in 1978 in the P4 laboratory of the U.S. Army Medical Research Institute of Infectious Diseases in Fort Detrick. Proponents of this theory claim that 90% of HIV RNA is found in Visna and 10% in HTLV I. Genomic analysis, however, shows that such claims are false. Research after Segal's theory shows that HIV is much more closely related to the simian immunodeficiency virus than to any other virus.

HIV therapy hypothesis
Segal suggested an HIV therapy of anti-inflammatory aspirin or ultraviolet radiation of the patient's blood in order to reduce the metabolic activity of macrophages, which are host cells for HIV. He also supported the idea of a p24- vaccine without gp120 which was patented by Jonas Salk as "Remune".

Works
Jakob Segal/Lilli Segal: Aids - die Spur führt ins Pentagon zusammen mit Manuel Kiper, Biokrieg, Vg. Neuer Weg, 2. ergänzte Auflage Oktober 1990, 
Manuel Kiper: Seuchengefahr aus der Retorte - Vom sorglosen Umgang mit Genen, Viren und Bakterien, rororo Verlag, 1992, 
Lilli Segal/ Jakob Segal/ Christoph Klug: AIDS can be conquered, Verlag Neuer Weg 1995/2001, 
Jakob Segal: AIDS Zellphysiologie Pathologie und Therapie, Verlag Neuer Weg 1992, 
Jacob Segal: wie das Leben auf der Erde entstand, DIETZ VERLAG BERLIN, 2. Auflage 1958
Jakob Segal und Gunther Seng und andere: Methoden der UV- Bestrahlung von Blut—HOT und UVB, Hippokrates Verlag Stuttgart 1990, 
Jakob Segal, Ute Körner, Kate P. Leiterer: Die Entstehung des Lebens aus Biophysikalischer Sicht, VEB Gustav Fischer Verlag 1983, Bestellnummer: 533 7707
Jakob Segal: Biophysikalische Aspekte der elementaren Zellfunktionen, VEB Georg Thieme Verlag Leipzig 1978, Bestellnummer: 532 816 5

See also
 Active measures

References

External links
Hiv, Visna Heteroduplex, Gonda, 1985, i
Hiv, Visna Heteroduplex, Gonda, 1985, ii
Thomar, Ähnlichkeit von Aids und Visna
Report by Jakob Segal about the origin of AIDS (published by monochrom in 1993; German language)

1911 births
1995 deaths
AIDS origin hypotheses
East German scientists
Academic staff of the Humboldt University of Berlin
Scientists from Königsberg
Lithuanian Jews
Jews in the French resistance
People of the Stasi
German emigrants to France
Communist members of the French Resistance
Immigrants to East Germany
Sorbonne Paris North University alumni
White Russian emigrants to Germany